Disco Raja is a 2020 Indian Telugu-language science fiction action film directed by Vi Anand and produced by Ram Talluri under SRT Entertainments banner. It stars Ravi Teja in a dual role along with Payal Rajput, Nabha Natesh, Tanya Hope, Bobby Simha,  Sunil, and Vennela Kishore. The music is composed by S. Thaman with cinematography by Karthik Ghattamaneni and editing by Shravan Katikaneni. In the film, a new scientific discovery is used by a group of scientists to reanimate a murdered music-loving gangster.

Disco Raja was released theatrically on 24 January 2020, and received mixed reviews from critics, who praised Ravi Teja's performance, action sequences, soundtrack and background score, but the film became a box-office bomb. Subsequently, the plans for a sequel were canceled.

Plot 
A brutally attacked man left for dead in the mountain ranges of Ladakh, is found frozen by an expedition team. He is taken to the "Re-Live lab", where Dr. Shishir introduces a technology that can revive dead people to Dr. Parineeti and her colleague Phalguni. Following the experiment, the subject wakes up but with no memory of his past. In Delhi, the subject's girlfriend Nabha explains to a loan officer that the subject named Vasu, handled multiple professions from day to night, during which she fell for him. While searching for his stepbrother Kaushik, who snatched the family's money, Vasu found him, but never returned. She also reveals that Vasu's family members are actually orphans who came to live together.

Meanwhile, Vasu escapes using Parineeti's card, but is recaptured after he faints due to being exposed to heavy lighting. Parineeti explains that Vasu was killed by someone and revived by the doctors, but is adamant about making Vasu revive his memories, and retrieves a commodity found with his corpse, giving it to Phalguni for servicing. In an attempt to gain the attention of those who remember him, Vasu thrashes a minister, and the video goes viral following his arrest. An aged gangster named Burma Sethu is surprised to find Vasu alive and sends his men to pick him from the police station with the help of Laalu Sastry's group. The goons take away Vasu, his brother and the doctors. 

However, Phalguni throws out Vasu's package given by Parineeti, and Vasu picks up the package to find a music player and headphones. Listening to the music, Vasu's memories are revived, and fights off the henchmen, revealing himself to be Disco Raj; this information also reaches to Sethu by Laalu Sastry. Shishir explains that Raj's actual age is 70 as he was frozen for 35 years, and is possibly not Vasu. Raj takes Phalguni along with him on a quest to rediscover his identity. In the hospital, an injured Shishir explains to Sethu about Raj's revival. Raj visits the Madras Bar founded by him, where a friend explains that Raj was a music-loving gangster, who is at loggerheads with Sethu, a rival gangster whose refusal to collaborate sparked a gang war. 

Both parties killed each other's members, but Raj succeeded in getting Sethu arrested for life.  Raj also fell for a deaf and mute girl named Helen, who initially declined,but eventually reciprocated his feelings. When Helen got pregnant before marriage, Raj married her, faked his own death and left behind his gang to start a new life. However, Sethu was freed from prison and vengefully killed Raj's gang members. Raj and Helen were also attacked in Ladakh, but Raj managed to send Helen away in a truck before himself getting killed. After the revelation, Raj is confronted by Vasu and reveals himself as his son. Arriving at the spot, Raj and Phalguni are attacked by Vasu, who questions Raj about killing Helen. Raj denies killing her and gets into a fight with Sethu. 

A stabbed Sethu reveals he did not get Raj killed in Ladakh, and he came after him to avenge his wife's murder. Raj denies killing her where he realizes the truth, and shoots the cop, who had not just brainwashed Vasu, but also sent goons to kill Vasu's family. Seeing the photo of the officer's corpse, the goons retreat. Raj and Phalguni discover that a man named Anthony Das gave orders to kill them, and along with Vasu, hold Anthony's men on gunpoint, before Anthony, revealed to be Raj's gang member Uttar Kumar, shoots Raj. He reveals that he killed Sethu's wife and got the latter to kill Raj's gang. Anthony even faked his own death and was one of the men who stabbed Raj in Ladakh. 

However, Raj, Vasu and Phalguni together fight off and finish the goons. Raj later kills Anthony, and himself succumbs to the injuries. Returning to Delhi, Vasu pays his family's loan with the help of Kaushik and reconciles with Nabha. In the lab, Raj is brought back to life once again by the doctors, while Sethu and Anthony are also recovering in the lab.

Cast

Music
Music was composed by S. Thaman, collaborating with Ravi Teja for the eleventh time and with Vi Anand for the second time after Tiger.

The first single track titled "Nuvvu Naatho Emannavo" was released on 19 October 2019. The melody was sung by S. P. Balasubrahmanyam and lyrics penned by Sirivennela Seetharama Sastry.

The second single track, "Dilli Wala", was released on 20 December 2019; the peppy number was sung by Aditya Iyengar, Geetha Madhuri, Rahul Nambiar and lyrics penned by Ramajogayya Sastry. Thaman has given an EDM touch to it with his contemporary score.

Marketing
The film's motion poster was released on Teja's birthday and Republic Day 26 January 2019.
The first look poster of Bobby Simha was released on 6 November 2019, on his birthday and revealed his character as Burma Sethu.
On 4 December 2019 movie has announced the teaser trailer release date by releasing a new poster featuring Teja.
First look poster of Payal Rajput was released on 5 December 2019, on her birthday. First look poster of Nabha Natesh was released on 11 December 2019, on her birthday.
The teaser trailer of the film was released on 6 December 2019. The second teaser trailer of the film was released on 13 January 2020.
The Pre-release event was held on 19 January 2020 at N convention Madhapur, Hyderabad.

Release 
The film was released on 24 January 2020.

References

External links

2020s Telugu-language films
2020 science fiction action films
2020 films
Indian science fiction action films
Indian historical action films
Indian films about revenge
Films about death
Films about technology
Films set in Delhi
Films set in the 1980s
Films scored by Thaman S
Indian gangster films
Films about organised crime in India
Films set in Ladakh
Indian science fiction films